The Institute for the History of Science was established in 1954 as an institution of the Polish Academy of Sciences in Poland.

Overview 
The Institute is located in the Staszic Palace in the center of Warsaw, near the Copernicus monument. Among its founders were professors: Bogdan Suchodolski and Aleksander Birkenmajer. In the mid 1970s, it was renamed to the Institute for the History of Science, Education and Technology. Since 1994, the name has been shortened to the Institute for the History of Science, but with its previous research scope. The head of its present Academic Council is Leszek Zasztowt.
Since 2011 the Institute has taken the official name of Ludwik Birkenmajer and Aleksander Birkenmajer: L & A Birkenmajer Institute for the History of Science (Polish: Instytut Historii Nauki PAN imienia Ludwika i Aleksandra Birkenmajerów).

Structure 
The Institute consists of two departments: the Department of the History of Social Sciences, History of Education and Scholarly Institutions (Sections: History of Social Sciences, History of Education, History of Scientific Organizations), and the Department of the History of Exact Sciences, Natural Sciences and Technology (Sections: History of Exact Sciences and Technology, History of Medicine, History of Chemistry and Pharmacy, History of Mathematics).

Field of interest 
The Institute conducts research focused on the history of science, both humanities and social sciences as well as natural and exact sciences, and the history of technology. The history of culture and history of education and pedagogical thought are also main research fields, equally with the history of ideas and its philosophical milieu.

Notable academics 
 Aleksander Birkenmajer
 Paweł Czartoryski
 Tadeusz Kowalik
 Jerzy Michalski
 Jerzy Osiatyński
 Bolesław Skarżyński
 Ryszard Terlecki
 Bogdan Suchodolski
 Leszek Zasztowt

Series editions 
 Nicolaus Copernicus, Opera omnia, Vol. I–IV, 1973–2007;  editor Aleksander Birkenmajer and Paweł Czartoryski, and successors. 
 History of Polish Science (Historia nauki polskiej, in Polish, Vol. I–X, 1970–2015; and continuation, editor Bogdan Suchodolski and successors.
 Studia Copernicana, Vol. I–XLI, 1970–2009; and continuation, editor Paweł Czartoryski and successors.
 Monographs on the History of Science and Technology.
 Monographs on the History of Education, editor Leszek Zasztowt.
 Fontes Rerum ad Historiam Scientiae Spectantium (Sources to the History of Science).
 History of Education Archives, Vol. I–XIII and continuation.

Journals 
 Analecta. Studies and Materials for the History of Science ("Analecta. Studia i Materiały z Dziejów Nauki", semi-annual journal published in Polish with English summaries).
 Quarterly Journal for the History of Science and Technology ("Kwartalnik Historii Nauki i Techniki").
 Dissertations on the History of Education ("Rozprawy z Dziejów Oświaty", annual journal publishing articles in Polish, English and Russian).
 Organon, annual journal founded in 1936 and published in English, French, German, Italian and Spanish.

Bibliography 
 Instytut Historii Nauki Polskiej Akademii Nauk w latach 1953–2003. Księga jubileuszowa z okazji pięćdziesięciolecia działalności, edited by Joanna Schiller and Leszek Zasztowt, Warszawa 2004.

External links
 Official website 
 Electronic catalog of the Library of the Institute for the History of Science of the Polish Academy of Sciences 
 Institute for the History of Science of the Polish Academy of Sciences in the Polish Science database 

Educational institutions established in 1954
History institutes
History of science organizations
Institutes of the Polish Academy of Sciences
1954 establishments in Poland
History organisations based in Poland